Mount Dodge is a mainly ice-free peak in Antarctica,  high, on a mountain spur descending northward from the Prince Olav Mountains, at the confluence of Holzrichter Glacier and Gough Glacier. It was discovered by the U.S. Ross Ice Shelf Traverse Party (1957–58) under A.P. Crary, and named for Professor Carroll W. Dodge, who analyzed and reported upon lichens and lichen parasites for the Byrd Antarctic Expedition (1933–35).

References 

Mountains of the Ross Dependency
Dufek Coast